Momentum, or linear momentum, is a vector quantity in physics.

Momentum may also refer to:

Economics
 Momentum (finance), an empirical tendency for rising asset prices to continue to rise
 Momentum (technical analysis), an indicator used in technical analysis of asset prices
 Momentum investing, a system of buying stocks or other securities

Mathematics, science, and technology
 Angular momentum, in physics, the rotational equivalent of linear momentum
 Behavioral momentum, a theory and metaphor used in the quantitative analysis of behavior
 Momentum (electromagnetic simulator), a software package from EEsof
 Momentum theory, a theory in fluid mechanics
 Momentum, in mathematics, a correction term in gradient descent and stochastic gradient descent
 Momentum, a solar car built in 2005 by the University of Michigan Solar Car Team

Arts and entertainment

Film
 Momentum (IMAX film), a 1992 documentary short, the first film shot and released in the IMAX HD format
 Momentum (2001 film), a surfing documentary
 Momentum (2003 film), an American-German science fiction television film
 Momentum (2015 film), a South African action-thriller film
 Momentum Pictures, UK motion picture distributor

Music

Albums
 Momentum (Bill Evans album), 2012
 Momentum (Dave Burrell album) or the title song, 2006
 Momentum (DGM album), 2013
 Momentum (Jamie Cullum album), 2013
 Momentum (Joshua Redman album), 2005
 Momentum (Neal Morse album) or the title song, 2012
 Momentum (Steve Hackett album) or the title song, 1988
 Momentum (Steve Lacy album) or the title song, 1987
 Momentum (TobyMac album) or the title song, 2001
 Momentum, Willisau 1988, by Jimmy Giuffre and André Jaume, or the title song, 1997
 Momentum, by Close to Home, 2012
 Momentum, by GBH, 2017

EPs
 Momentum (Battery EP), 1998
 Momentum (Stevie Stone EP) or the title song, 2012
 Momentum (Live in Manila), by Planetshakers, or the title song, 2016

Songs
 "Momentum", by Aimee Mann from the Magnolia film soundtrack, 1999
 "Momentum", by Amaranthe from Helix, 2018
 "Momentum", by Ayumi Hamasaki from Secret, 2006
 "Momentum", by Nuno Lupi from Intermezzo
 "Momentum", by Zumpano from Goin' Through Changes, 1996

Other uses
 Momentum (organisation), a British political organisation
 Momentum (pickleball), motion that unintentionally causes a player to step into the non-volley zone
 Momentum Movement, a Hungarian political party
 Momentum Party, a New Zealand political party
 Operation Momentum, a guerrilla training program of the Laotian Civil War
 Momentum, a magazine published by the National Catholic Educational Association
 Momentum, a Christian festival run by the UK charity Soul Survivor
 Momentum, a website on civil rights published by Medium

See also
 
 
 Moment (disambiguation)
 Omentum (disambiguation)